The "Creggan White Hare" is an Irish folk song written by James Molloy. It was first recorded by Paddy Tunney in 1944.

The song describes coursing events that took place in Creggan, County Tyrone. After Barney Conway failed to catch the hare while out hunting, he joins a group of sportsmen, "with pedigree greyhounds", to hunt the hare, who eludes them.

Recordings
The following is a select list of recordings of the song.

 Paddy Tunney (1945)
 Andy Irvine; with Dick Gaughan on Parallel Lines (1982)
 Karan Casey, on Songlines (1997)
 Kevin Mitchell, on Have a Drop Mair, Musical Tradition Records MTCD315-6 CD (2001)
 Daoirí Farrell, on The First Turn (2008)

References

External links
 University of Ulster field recordings

Irish folk songs
1944 songs